Pivoting may refer to:
The act of finding a pivot element
A type of computer security exploit
Pivoting (TV series), a Fox comedy series 2022-

See also
Pivot (disambiguation)